St. John Cathedral, (or more formally the Ukrainian Orthodox Cathedral of St. John the Baptist, often misspelled St. John’s) in Edmonton, is the throne of the Bishop of the Western Eparchy of the Ukrainian Orthodox Church of Canada.  The current bishop for the cathedral is Ilarion (Rudnyk).

Cultural Centre
St. John's Cultural Centre was developed and opened for use in 1965. A number of additions and renovations have enhanced the original facility, the latest being the Solarium, which was completed in 2001. The facility was established primarily to accommodate the needs of the congregation, various Ukrainian associations and the community at large.

The Cultural Centre is used for events such as weddings, banquets, socials, memorial dinners, seminars, workshops, conferences and meetings.

See also
Ukrainian Orthodox Church of Canada
Archbishop of Edmonton and Western Canada

External links
Official parish website
Parish profile on UOCC website

Churches in Edmonton
Ukrainian Orthodox Church of Canada cathedrals
20th-century Eastern Orthodox church buildings
Ukrainian-Canadian culture in Alberta
20th-century churches in Canada